This is a list of television series and films produced as part of the Digimon franchise created by Bandai. The franchise revolves around monsters of various forms living in a "Digital World", a parallel universe that originated from Earth's various communication networks.

Series overview

List of episodes

Season 1: Digimon Adventure (1999–2000)

Season 2: Digimon Adventure 02 (2000–01)

Season 3: Digimon Tamers (2001–02)

Season 4: Digimon Frontier (2002–03)

Season 5: Digimon Data Squad (Digimon Savers) (2006–07)

Season 6: Digimon Fusion (Digimon Xros Wars) (2010–12)

Season 8: Digimon Universe: App Monsters (2016–17)

Season 9: Digimon Adventure: (2020–21)

Season 10: Digimon Ghost Game (2021–present)

Movies

To date, a total of seventeen films have been released based on the franchise.

 Digimon Adventure (Part one of Digimon: The Movie)
 Digimon Adventure: Our War Game! (Part two of Digimon: The Movie)
 Digimon Adventure 02: Digimon Hurricane Touchdown / Supreme Evolution! The Golden Digimentals (Part three of Digimon: The Movie)
 Digimon Adventure 02: Diaboromon Strikes Back (Revenge of Diaboromon)
 Digimon Tamers: The Adventurers' Battle (Battle of Adventurers)
 Digimon Tamers: Runaway Digimon Express (Runaway Locomon)
 Digimon Frontier: Revival of the Ancient Digimon (Island of Lost Digimon)
 Digital Monster X-Evolution
 Digimon Savers: Ultimate Power! Activate Burst Mode!!
 Digimon Adventure: Last Evolution Kizuna

Film series: Digimon Adventure tri.

At an event celebrating the series' 15th anniversary on August 1, 2014, a new Digimon Adventure series was announced, scheduled to air in Spring 2015, depicting the main characters as they enter high school. It was later announced that the series would be a six-part theatrical anime.

OVA

Digimon Adventure 20th Memorial Story

Notes

References

 
Episodes